Tari may refer to the following people:

Given name
Tari Eason (born 2001), American basketball player
Tari Khan (born 1953), Pakistani tabla player and vocalist
Tari Phillips (born 1969), American basketball player
Tari Signor (born 1967), American actress

Surname
Aryan Tari (born 1999), Norwegian chess player
Ben Tari (born 1972), Australian actor
Cut Tari (born 1977), Indonesian soap opera actress and model
El Tari (1926–1978), Indonesian Governor
Kenny Tari (born 1990), Vanuatuan cricketer
Le Tari (1946–1987), American actor 
Moulana Abdullah Tari, Indian politician
Ronald Tari (born 1994), Vanuatuan cricketer
Steven Tari (1971–2013), Papua New Guinean religious figure
Tan Tarı (born 1935), Turkish wrestler
Zainab Tari, 11th century Queen of Sindh (modern-day Pakistan)